Dehury sahi is a small village in Angul district, Odisha, India.

Villages in Angul district